Abū Abdullāh Badr ad-Dīn Mohammed bin Abdullah bin Bahādir az-Zarkashī (1344–1392/ 745–794 AH), better known as Az-Zarkashī, was a fourteenth century Islamic scholar. He primarily resided in Mamluk-era Cairo. He specialized in the fields of law, hadith, history and Shafi'i legal jurisprudence (fiqh). He left behind thirty compendia, but the majority of these are lost to modern researchers and only the titles are known. One of his most famous works that has survived is al-Burhan fee 'Uloom al-Qur'an, a manual of the Qur'anic sciences.

Teachers
Az-Zarkashī studied hadīth (one of various reports describing the words, actions, or habits of the prophet Muhammad) in Damascus with Imād al-Dīn Ibn Kathir (d. 1373), fiqh and usūl in Aleppo with Shihāb ud-Dīn Al-Adhra`I (d. 1381), and Quran and fiqh in Cairo with the head of the Shafi’i school in Cairo at the time, Jamal al-Din al-Isnawi.

Disciples 
His notable students included Shamsuddīn al-Barmaid (d. 830 AH) and Najmuddin bin Haji ad-Dimashqi (d. 831 AH).

Works 
Al-bahr al-muhīt fī usūl al-fiqh (البحر المحيط، في أصول الفقه)
Salāsil adh-dhahab fī usūl al-fiqh (سلاسل الذهب في أصول الفقه)
Al-burhān fī ʿulūm al-Qur'ān (البرهان في علوم القرآن)
Iʿlam as-sājid bi-ahkām al-masājid (إعلام الساجد بأحكام المساجد)
"The  Corrective: ʿĀ’isha’s  Rectification  of  the  Companions" Al-Ijāba limā istadrakatahu ‘Ā’isha ‘alā as-Sahāba ( الإجابة لما استدركته عائشة على الصحابة) 
At-tadhkirah fī al-ahādīth al-mushtaharah (التذكرة في الأحاديث المشتهرة)
Risāla fī maʿnī kalimat fī at-Tawhid (lā ilaha illallah) (رسالة في معني كلمة التوحيد (لا إله إلا الله
Al-manthūr fī al-qawāʿid fiqh ash-Shāfiʿiyyah (المنثور في القواعد فقه شافعي): is considered by many scholars to be among the foremost compendiums of legal principles in the Shāfi'i fiqh. The text includes over 100 principles that are listed alphabetically.  
Takhrīj ahādīth ash-sharh al-kabīr li ar-Rāfiʿī (تخريج أحاديث الشرح الكبير للرافعي)
Al-ghurar as-sāfir fīmā yahtāju ilaihi al-musāfir (الغرر السافر فيما يحتاج إليه المسافر)

See also 
 List of Ash'aris and Maturidis

References

1344 births
1392 deaths
14th-century Muslim scholars of Islam
Asharis
Hadith scholars
Sunni Muslim scholars of Islam
Sunni fiqh scholars
Shafi'is
Sharia judges
Theologians from the Mamluk Sultanate
14th-century jurists